The  is a river in Japan which originates in Takayama, Gifu. It flows through Gero before emptying into the Hida River. Due to its clear waters, it is home to the Japanese giant salamander.

Major dams
The river has two major dams along its length, the Iwaya Dam and the Mazegawa Dam. The Mazegawa Dam lead to the formation of the Lake Kanayama.

References

Rivers of Gifu Prefecture
Rivers of Japan